Rupert Elder is an English professional poker player. He turned professional in 2009, after graduating from Warwick University with a degree in Economics. He holds a European Poker Tour title and an Aussie Millions ring. He is also known by his PokerStars screenname, ElRupert. His total tournament winnings, both live and online, exceed $3,000,000.

Online poker 
Elder has several notable online tournament victories. In October 2010, he came runner-up in the Full Tilt Poker Million-Dollar Guarantee for $142,846. In April 2012 he took fifth place in the PokerStars Sunday Million for $59,770. According to PocketFives.com, an online tournament player ranking site, Elder has amassed over $1.1 million in online tournament earnings.

European Poker Tour 
In May 2011, Elder won the European Poker Tour in San Remo for €930,000 ($1,225,647), defeating German professional Max Heinzelmann heads-up. In April 2013, Elder won the €1,100 turbo event at the EPT Berlin for €49,800.

World Series of Poker 
In September 2011, he was featured heavily in the ESPN coverage of the World Series of Poker main event, where he eventually finished in 132nd position for $54,851. He also took 18th in the $2500 six-handed event at the WSOP for $25,769.

Aussie Millions 
In January 2013, Elder won the inaugural event at the Aussie Millions for 250,000 AUD ($263,925), defeating a field of 1338 players.

As of 2013, his live tournament winnings exceed $1.9 million.

Twitch streaming 
Rupert was once the most popular poker player on the streaming site Twitch, at one point holding the largest ever live streamed tournament win of $124,000, at one point holding the largest ever live streamed tournament win. Elder is however most famous for once eating a moth live on stream.

References

External links
 Official blog

English poker players
European Poker Tour winners
Living people
Year of birth missing (living people)
Sportspeople from Bury St Edmunds
Alumni of the University of Warwick
Place of birth missing (living people)